Daniël Breedijk (born 13 February 1995) is a Dutch professional footballer who plays as a centre-back for Helmond Sport in the Eerste Divisie.

Career
He formerly played for Sparta Rotterdam, FC Dordrecht and Almere City. 

On 24 June 2022, Breedijk joined Helmond Sport on a one-year deal with an option for an additional season.

Honours

Club
Sparta Rotterdam
 Eerste Divisie: 2015-16

References

External links
 Profile - Voetbal International
 

1995 births
Living people
Footballers from Rotterdam
Association football central defenders
Dutch footballers
Sparta Rotterdam players
FC Dordrecht players
Almere City FC players
Helmond Sport players
Eerste Divisie players